Caladenia incensum, commonly known as the glistening spider orchid is a species of orchid endemic to the south-west of Western Australia. It has a single, hairy leaf and three glistening white flowers which have a red-striped labellum.

Description
Caladenia incensum is a terrestrial, perennial, deciduous, herb with an underground tuber and which sometimes forms large colonies. The sepals and petals spread widely near their bases but have long, drooping thread-like tips. The sides of the labellum have short, curved teeth, the tip is turned downwards and there are two rows of broad, anvil-shaped, white calli along its centre. Flowering occurs from late June to September.

Taxonomy and naming
The glistening spider orchid was first formally described in 2001 by Stephen Hopper and Andrew Phillip Brown from a specimen collected in the Chiddarcooping Hill Nature Reserve north of Westonia and given the name Caladenia incensa. The description was published in Nuytsia. In order that the genus and species names were of the same gender, the name was changed to Caladenia incensum. The specific epithet (incensum) is a Latin word meaning "resinous material that yields a fragrant odour or smoke when burned" referring to the sharp, burning metal odour of this orchid.

The World Checklist of Selected Plant Families gives the name C. incensa but the Western Australian Herbarium lists this name as a spelling mistake.

Distribution and habitat
The glistening spider orchid occurs between Hyden and Nerren Nerren Station, north of the Murchison River in the Avon Wheatbelt, Coolgardie, Geraldton Sandplains, Mallee, Murchison and Yalgoo biogeographic regions where it grows under shrubs on and near granite outcrops.

Conservation
Caladenia incensum is classified as "not threatened" by the Western Australian Government Department of Parks and Wildlife.

References

incensum
Orchids of Western Australia
Endemic orchids of Australia
Plants described in 2001
Endemic flora of Western Australia
Taxa named by Stephen Hopper
Taxa named by Andrew Phillip Brown